Ormia is a small genus of nocturnal flies in the family Tachinidae, that are parasitoids of crickets. The genus occurs throughout the Americas.

Flies in this genus have become model organisms in sound localization experiments because of their "ears", which are complex structures inside the fly's prothorax near the bases of the front legs. The most common and widespread species, Ormia ochracea, has been the center of this research.

Species
These 27 species belong to the genus Ormia:

 Ormia aldrichi Seguy, 1925 c g
 Ormia australis (Townsend, 1911) c
 Ormia bilimekii (Brauer and Bergenstamm, 1889) i c g
 Ormia brevicornis Townsend, 1919 i c g b
 Ormia carreirai Tavares, 1965 c g
 Ormia crespoi Tavares, 1965 c g
 Ormia depleta (Wiedemann, 1830) i c g
 Ormia dominicana Townsend, 1919 i c g b
 Ormia guianica Curran, 1934 c g
 Ormia lenkoi Tavares, 1965 c g
 Ormia lenti Tavares, 1965 c g
 Ormia lineifrons Sabrosky, 1953 i c g b
 Ormia lopesi Tavares, 1962 c g
 Ormia mendesi Tavares, 1965 c g
 Ormia nocturna Curran, 1934 c g
 Ormia nuttingi (Sabrosky, 1953) c g
 Ormia ochracea (Bigot, 1889) i c g b
 Ormia pellucida Seguy, 1925 c g
 Ormia punctata Robineau-Desvoidy, 1830 i c g
 Ormia rachoui Tavares, 1962 c g
 Ormia reinhardi (Sabrosky, 1953) i c g b
 Ormia rosenoi Tavares, 1965 c g
 Ormia rufa (Wulp, 1890) c g
 Ormia serrei Seguy, 1925 c g
 Ormia tarsalis Seguy, 1925 c g
 Ormia wolcotti Sabrosky, 1953 c g
 Ormia wygodzinskyi Tavares, 1965 c g

Data sources: i = ITIS, c = Catalogue of Life, g = GBIF, b = Bugguide.net

References

Tachininae